Bradley Theodore Hyman is currently John B. Penney, Jr. Professor of Neurology at Harvard Medical School and Director of the Massachusetts Alzheimer Disease Research Center and Memory Disorder Unit at Massachusetts General Hospital. He was educated at Northwestern University (BA Chemistry, 1977) and the University of Iowa (PhD; MD). He was awarded the Metlife Foundation Award for Medical Research in Alzheimer's Disease in 2001 and the Potamkin Prize in 2006, together with Karen Duff and Karen Ashe.

References

Year of birth missing (living people)
Living people
Northwestern University alumni
University of Iowa alumni
Harvard Medical School faculty
Place of birth missing (living people)
University of Iowa faculty
Members of the National Academy of Medicine